Lukáš Dlouhý and Leander Paes were the defending champions, but they lost in the final to Daniel Nestor and Nenad Zimonjić.

Seeds

Draw

Finals

Top half

Section 1

Section 2

Bottom half

Section 3

Section 4

References
Main Draw
2010 French Open – Men's draws and results at the International Tennis Federation

Men's Doubles
French Open by year – Men's doubles
French Open